La Celestina is an opera by Flavio Testi to a libretto by Renato Prinzhofer after La Celestina by Fernando de Rojas. It was first performed at the Maggio Musicale Fiorentino on May 28, 1963.

Recording
Fedora Barbieri, Magda Olivero, Maria Teresa Mandalari, Lino Puglesi, Mirto Picchi, Orchestra del Maggio Musicale Fiorentino, Gianandrea Gavazzeni 1962

References

Compositions by Flavio Testi
Operas
1963 operas
Italian-language operas
Operas based on novels